The Ambassador automobile company of Chicago, Illinois was founded in 1921 by John Hertz.

History
In the late 1910s Hertz took control of the Walden W. Shaw Livery Corporation. The company had already been producing a car of their own, called the Weidely. He took the rest of the stock bodies and put 6-cylinder Continental engines in them, then sold them. The cars had full-leather trunks. In February 1921, the cars made their debut at the Drake Hotel in Chicago, Illinois during the Chicago Automobile Show. A 4-cylinder car costing $700 was announced in October of that year, but it was never made. After the original Weidely stock was used up, a smaller car was designed. After 1925, Hertz named it after himself.

Models

References

Motor vehicle manufacturers based in Illinois
Companies based in Chicago